Ethel is an unincorporated community in Greenfield Township, Orange County, in the U.S. state of Indiana.

History
A post office was established at Ethel in 1891, and remained in operation until 1939. Ethel Hollen, an early postmaster, gave the community her name.

Geography

References

Unincorporated communities in Orange County, Indiana
Unincorporated communities in Indiana